Still Here is an American fashion brand, based in New York City that designs and sells clothing. The company is known for its vintage-inspired denim jeans. The brand was first popularized by celebrities Hailey Bieber, Emma Chamberlain and Chiara Ferragni.

Overview 
The brand was founded in 2018 by husband and wife team, Sonia and Maurice Mosseri, childhood friends from Brooklyn, New York. Inspired by the fades, rips and patches of her father's childhood jeans, Sonia launched Still Here on Instagram in 2018 with a small line of hand-painted denim.

The vintage style silhouette and hand-painted detail attracted the attention of major luxury department store Barneys New York. Still Here's first season launched with Barneys in 2019 and soon after expanded Internationally with Net-A-Porter.

In mid-2022, Still Here opened their first brick-and-mortar retail location in New York City's Nolita neighborhood. In April 2022, the company launched a sustainability initiative in the form of Still Here Café. Waste from their denim production process is recycled into a fertilizer, which is then used to grow coffee trees in Guatemala. The beans harvested from this process are roasted in small batches and served in their retail store location. The jeans are hand finished in Los Angeles.

References 

Clothing companies based in New York City